Yuri Alexeyevich Khmylev (Yuriy Alekseevich Khmylyov; born August 9, 1964) is a Russian former professional ice hockey player. Khmylev played 11 seasons in his native Russia for Krylya Sovetov (Soviet Wings) before being selected as a 27-year-old in the 5th round, 108th overall, of the 1992 NHL Entry Draft by the Buffalo Sabres.

Russian career
Khmylev represented the former Soviet Union several times on the international stage, beginning with the 1984 gold medal-winning World Junior Championships squad.  Khmylev went on to play on the Soviet squads in the 1986, 1987 and 1989 World Championships (winning gold, silver, and gold medals, respectively).  He played in Rendez-vous '87, a two-game series in Quebec City versus a team of National Hockey League all-stars and participated in the Canada Cup later that year, where the Soviets placed second.  In 1989, Khmylev played in two games for CSKA Moscow during the Super Series against NHL clubs.

Khmylev also suited up for his long-time team, Krylya Sovetov, when it played several NHL teams during the 1989–90 season, and during the Friendship Tour games in Moscow in 1989 and 1990.  His final appearance for Russian hockey came during the 1992 Winter Olympics in Albertville, France.  The Unified Team, consisting of players from former Soviet states, won the gold medal, defeating Canada in the final tournament of the Olympics.  Khmylev scored 10 points in eight games during the Olympics.

North American career
Khmylev was selected the following summer by the Sabres and came to North America.  He experienced immediate success in the NHL, scoring 20 goals as a rookie in 1992–93 and 27 the following season.  His scoring tailed off following the 1994–95 NHL lockout, as he scored just 16 goals in his next 114 games for the Sabres.  On March 20, 1996, Khmylev was traded to the St. Louis Blues along with Buffalo's 8th round choice (Andrei Podkonicky) in the 1996 NHL Entry Draft for Jean-Luc Grand-Pierre, Ottawa's 2nd round choice (previously acquired, Buffalo selected Cory Sarich) in 1996 NHL Entry Draft and St. Louis' 3rd round choice (Maxim Afinogenov) in the 1997 NHL Entry Draft.  Following the trade, Khmylev went on to play in just nine more NHL games with the Blues, scoring one goal.  For his NHL career, Khmylev accumulated 64 goals, 88 assists and 133 penalty minutes in 263 games.

Following a brief stint with HC Fribourg-Gottéron of the Swiss Nationalliga A in 1997–98, Khmylev returned to North America for his final professional season. In 1998–99, he suited up for the St. John's Maple Leafs of the American Hockey League, where he amassed 33 points in 48 games.

Khmylev returned to Buffalo following his retirement, as he is now an amateur scout with the Buffalo Sabres. He has a wife, Vera, and a daughter, Olga, who played tennis at Boston College. Olga now works at the Academy of Hockey at HARBORCENTER in Buffalo, NY, and is the official video presenter for the IIHF at the World Championships.

Awards
Inducted into the Russian and Soviet Hockey Hall of Fame in 1992

International Medals:
1984 World Junior Championships - Gold
1986 World Championships - Gold
1987 World Championships - Silver
1989 World Championships - Gold
1992 Winter Olympics - Gold

Career statistics

Regular season and playoffs

International

External links

Yuri Khmylev @ Hockey CCCP International

1964 births
Living people
Buffalo Sabres draft picks
Buffalo Sabres players
Buffalo Sabres scouts
Hamilton Bulldogs (AHL) players
HC Fribourg-Gottéron players
Ice hockey players at the 1992 Winter Olympics
Krylya Sovetov Moscow players
Los Angeles Kings scouts
Medalists at the 1992 Winter Olympics
Olympic gold medalists for the Unified Team
Olympic ice hockey players of the Unified Team
Olympic medalists in ice hockey
Quebec Rafales players
Russian ice hockey left wingers
St. John's Maple Leafs players
St. Louis Blues players
Soviet ice hockey left wingers
Soviet Wings players
Ice hockey people from Moscow